The Argentina men's national field hockey squad records are the results for men's international field hockey competitions. The sport is controlled by the Argentine Hockey Confederation, the governing body for field hockey in Argentina.

Senior squad

Technical Staff:
Head Coach: Mariano Ronconi
Assistant Coaches: Lucas Rey
Medical Doctor: Javier Blanco
Physiotherapist: Mariano Arias
Physical Trainer: Leonardo Romagnoli
Team captain:

2020 squad
Players, caps and goals updated as of 12 February 2022.

INA Inactive
INJ Injured
INV Invitational

Changes from 2020 call-ups

Changes from last year call-ups and throughout the current year. Caps and goals updated as of 09 February 2022

Annual results

2020 goalscoring Table

Annual call-ups

Coach: Germán Orozco

 Nicolás Acosta (25) 
 Tomás Bettaglio (19) 
 Emiliano Bosso (3) 
 Agustín Bugallo (30) 
 Maico Casella (9) 
 Juan Catán (4) 
 Nicolás Cicileo (24) 
 Nicolás della Torre (14) 
 Tomás Domene (15) 
 Federico Fernández (28) 
 Martín Ferreiro (32) 
 Thomas Habif (29) 
 Isidoro Ibarra (20) 
 Pedro Ibarra (5) 
 Nicolás Keenan (7) 
 Juan Martín López (17) 
 Lucas Martínez (23) 
 Agustín Mazzilli (26) 
 Joaquín Menini (11) 
 Federico Monja (18) 
 Federico Moreschi (8) 
 Ignacio Ortiz (16) 
 Matías Paredes (10) 
 Gonzalo Peillat (2) 
 Matías Rey (22) 
 Lucas Rossi (27) 
 Tomás Santiago (21) 
 Santiago Tarazona (6) 
 Leandro Tolini (13) 
 Lucas Toscani (31) 
 Lucas Vila (12) 
 Juan Manuel Vivaldi (1) 

Coach: Germán Orozco—January

 Tomás Bettaglio (19) 
 Emiliano Bosso (3) 
 Agustín Bugallo (30) 
 Facundo Callioni (14) 
 Maico Casella (9) 
 Juan Catán (4) 
 Nicolás Cicileo (24) 
 Mauro Coria (31) 
 Tomás Domene (15) 
 Federico Fernández (28) 
 Martín Ferreiro (32) 
 Pedro Ibarra (5) 
 Nicolás Keenan (7) 
 Juan Martín López (17) 
 Lucas Martínez (23) 
 Agustín Mazzilli (26) 
 Federico Monja (18) 
 Ignacio Ortiz (16) 
 Matías Rey (22) 
 Lucas Rossi (27) 
 Tomás Santiago (21) 
 Santiago Tarazona (6) 
 Leandro Tolini (13) 
 Lucas Vila (12) 
 Juan Manuel Vivaldi (1) 

Coach: Mariano Ronconi—October

 Nicolás Acosta 
 Emiliano Bosso (3) 
 Agustín Bugallo (30) 
 Maico Casella (9) 
 Juan Catán (4) 
 Nicolás Cicileo (24) 
 Federico Fernández (28) 
 Martín Ferreiro (32) 
 Thomas Habif 
 Nehuen Hernando 
 Pedro Ibarra (5) 
 Isidoro Ibarra 
 Nicolás Keenan (7) 
 Juan Martín López (17) 
 Lucas Martínez (23) 
 Agustín Mazzilli (26) 
 Federico Monja (18) 
 Federico Moreschi 
 Ignacio Nepote 
 Ignacio Ortiz (16) 
 Matías Rey (22) 
 Tomás Santiago (21) 
 Santiago Tarazona (6) 
 Leandro Tolini (13) 
 Lucas Toscani 
 Diego Paz 
 Lucas Vila (12) 
 Juan Manuel Vivaldi (1) 

Coach: Mariano Ronconi—January

 Nicolás Acosta (25) 
 Emiliano Bosso (3) 
 Agustín Bugallo (30) 
 Maico Casella (9) 
 Juan Catán (4) 
 Nicolás Cicileo (24) 
 Thomas Habif (29) 
 Nehuén Hernando (2) 
 Isidoro Ibarra (20) 
 Pedro Ibarra (5) 
 Federico Fernández (28) 
 Martín Ferreiro (32) 
 Nicolás Keenan (7) 
 Juan Martín López (17) 
 Lucas Martínez (23) 
 Agustín Mazzilli (26) 
 Federico Monja (18) 
 Ignacio Nepote (19) 
 Ignacio Ortiz (16) 
 Diego Paz (15) 
 Joaquín Puglisi (11) 
 Matías Rey (22) 
 Tomás Santiago (21) 
 Santiago Tarazona (6) 
 Leandro Tolini (13) 
 Lucas Toscani (31) 
 Lucas Vila (12) 
 Juan Manuel Vivaldi (1) 
Added in March:
 Gaspar Garrone (33) 
 Facundo Zárate (34) 
Added in April:
 Nahuel Salis (8) 
Added in June:
 Lucas Rossi (27) 

Coach: Mariano Ronconi—November

 Nicolás Acosta (25) 
 Emiliano Bosso (3) 
 Agustín Bugallo (30) 
 Maico Casella (9) 
 Juan Catán (4) 
 Nicolás Cicileo (24) 
 Nicolás della Torre (14) 
 Thomas Habif (29) 
 Nehuén Hernando (2) 
 Federico Fernández (28) 
 Martín Ferreiro (32) 
 Ladislao Gencarelli 
 Nicolás Keenan (7) 
 Agustín Machelett 
 Lucas Martínez (23) 
 Tobías Martins 
 Agustín Mazzilli (26) 
 Federico Monja (18) 
 Ignacio Nepote (19) 
 Ignacio Ortiz (16) 
 Diego Paz (15) 
 Joaquín Puglisi (11) 
 Matías Rey (22) 
 Nahuel Salis (8) 
 Tomás Santiago (1) 
 Santiago Tarazona (6) 
 Leandro Tolini (13) 
 Lucas Toscani (31) 
 Lucas Vila (12) 
 Facundo Zárate (34) 
Added in December:
 Tomás Domene (21) 

Coach: Mariano Ronconi—January

 Nicolás Acosta (25) 
 Emiliano Bosso (3) 
 Agustín Bugallo (30) 
 Maico Casella (9) 
 Juan Catán (4) 
 Nicolás Cicileo (24) 
 Joaquín Coelho (33) 
 Nicolás della Torre (14) 
 Tomás Domene (21) 
 Gaspar Dubarry (35) 
 Federico Fernández (28) 
 Martín Ferreiro (32) 
 Ladislao Gencarelli (20) 
 Thomas Habif (29) 
 Nehuén Hernando (2) 
 Nicolás Keenan (7) 
 Agustín Machelett (27) 
 Lucas Martínez (23) 
 Tobías Martins (34) 
 Agustín Mazzilli (26) 
 Federico Monja (18) 
 Ignacio Nepote (19) 
 Ignacio Ortiz 
 Diego Paz (15) 
 Joaquín Puglisi (11) 
 Matías Rey (22) 
 Nahuel Salis (8) 
 Tomás Santiago (1) 
 Santiago Tarazona (6) 
 Leandro Tolini (13) 
 Lucas Toscani (31) 
 Lucas Vila 
 Facundo Zárate (5) 
Added in March:
 Franco Agostini (43) 
 Eugenio Balboa (42) 
 Santiago Binaghi (53) 
 Bautista Capurro (41) 
 Gonzalo Driemel (45) 
 Francisco Druziuk (56) 
 Lautaro Ferrero (50) 
 Ignacio Ibarra (44) 
 Máximo Kiernan (49) 
 Tadeo Marcucci (46) 
 Felipe Merlini (55) 
 Juan Ronconi (40) 
 Facundo Sarto (48) 
 Tobías Silvetti (54) 
 Jaime Terzi (47) 
 Santiago Torrigiani (52) 
 Joaquín Toscani (51) 

: Players overlined were initially called-up but quit or got retired before any competition of that year.
: Players in italic are part of a projection group or invitational.

Squad records in official competitions

 *All competitions scheduled to be held in 2020, were interrupted because of the COVID-19 pandemic and rescheduled for the following year.

2021–

* The Men's FIH Pro League since its second edition, takes place between the second half of a year and the first half of the following. The only exception is the second edition, which it was planned to be held from January to June 2020, but it was interrupted because of the COVID-19 pandemic and changed its schedule since.

 Current player

See also
Argentina men's national under-21 field hockey team
Argentina women's national field hockey squad records

References 

Record